Sempt is a river of Bavaria, Germany. It flows into the Mittlere-Isar-Kanal, which is connected with the Isar, west of Eching.

See also
List of rivers of Bavaria

References

Rivers of Bavaria
Rivers of Germany